The Howden Reservoir is a Y-shaped reservoir, the uppermost of the three in the Upper Derwent Valley, England. The western half of the reservoir lies in Derbyshire and the eastern half is in Sheffield, South Yorkshire; the county border runs through the middle of the reservoir, following the original path of the River Derwent. The reservoir is bounded at the southern end by Howden Dam; below this, the Derwent flows immediately into Derwent Reservoir and subsequently the Ladybower Reservoir. Other tributaries include the River Westend, Howden Clough and Linch Clough.

Work commenced on the dam's construction on 16 July 1901 and completed in July 1912. The chief engineer was Edward Sandeman. He was also in charge of building nearby Derwent dam and was awarded the Telford Medal in 1918 for his work "Derwent Valley Waterworks". The works involved constructing a temporary village at Birchinlee, or "Tin Town", for the workers, a temporary railway line from the main line at Bamford, construction of a link aqueduct to the Derwent Dam. The workers who died during the construction of the dam were buried in St John the Baptist's Church, Bamford.

This is not to be confused with the more well-known Featherbed Moss on the Pennine Way between Kinder Scout and Bleaklow.

Reservoirs of the Peak District
Dams completed in 1912
Reservoirs in Derbyshire
1912 establishments in England
RHowden